The M70 road is a short metropolitan route in Johannesburg, South Africa. It connects Booysens (south of Johannesburg CBD) with Dobsonville via Diepkloof, Orlando and Meadowlands. For much of its route, it is known as the Soweto Highway.

Route 
The M70 begins at a junction with the M7 Road (Earp Road; Long Street) in the Booysens suburb of Johannesburg (south of Johannesburg CBD). It goes westwards as Ophir Booysens Road, joined by the Pat Mbatha Bus & Taxiway (part of the Rea Vaya road system; lanes are reserved for buses in both directions), to fly over the M1 Highway and bypass the Booysens Reserve suburb, where it changes its name to the Soweto Highway. It flies over the M17 Road and reaches the FNB Stadium (Soccer City) in Nasrec, where it forms an interchange with the M5 Road (Nasrec Road) before passing north of the stadium.

From the FNB Stadium, the M70 continues westwards as the Soweto Highway to meet the N1 Highway (Johannesburg Western Bypass; southbound only) and cross it to enter the northern part of Soweto. It forms the northern border of Diepkloof (where it meets the northern terminus of the M83 Road) before being the road separating Noordgesig in the north from Orlando East in the south, where it reaches a junction with the M10 Road (New Canada Road). The M10 joins the M70 and they are one road westwards, crossing a railway into Orlando West, to reach a roundabout, where the M10 becomes the road southwards (Klipspruit Valley Road) and the road northwards is meant to be an extension of the N17 National Route while the M70 remains as the westerly road.

From the M10/N17 junction, the M70 continues westwards, forming the northern border of Orlando West, becoming Modise street (no-longer named Soweto Highway), to pass through Meadowlands, where it changes its name to Van Onselen Road. Immediately after Meadowlands, it reaches its western terminus at a junction with the M77 Road (Elias Motsoaledi Road) at Mmesi Park, just north of Dobsonville.

References 

Streets and roads of Johannesburg
Metropolitan routes in Johannesburg